The Last Great Snail Chase is a film by Edward Lynden-Bell that is set in Wellington, New Zealand. It is produced by David White. The film follows the lives of six young people as they live their lives with the world beginning to end around them. The film has been completed and had its first screening to cast, crew and invited guests at the Paramount Theatre in Wellington on 16 April 2007. Producer David White and Writer Edward Lynden-Bell are attending the 2008 Cannes Film Festival with the film.

References

External links

2007 films
New Zealand drama films
2000s English-language films